This article lists the results of Levski Sofia in Еuropean competitions since the club's first participation in 1958.

The furthest stage Levski has reached is the quarter-finals of the Cup Winners' Cup in 1969–70, 1976–77 and 1986–87 and the quarter-finals of the UEFA Cup in 1975–76 and 2005–06.

Notable eliminations by Levski: Ajax, Dynamo Kyiv, Rangers, VfB Stuttgart (x2), Auxerre, Udinese, MSV Duisburg, Olympiacos, Dinamo București, Slavia Prague, Hajduk Split, Boavista, Brøndby, Djurgården, Śląsk Wrocław, PAOK, St. Gallen.

Notable wins: Barcelona, Ajax, Marseille, Lazio, Atlético Madrid, Rangers, VfB Stuttgart, Sporting CP, Austria Wien, Olympiacos, Górnik Zabrze, Auxerre, Dynamo Berlin, MSV Duisburg, Udinese, Dinamo București, Fenerbahçe, Beşiktaş, Hajduk Split, Brøndby, Boavista, Śląsk Wrocław, Sturm Graz, Gent, AIK, Dnipro, Spartak Trnava, Željezničar, Vojvodina, Dinamo Minsk, Admira Wacker, Chievo, APOEL, PAOK.

Total statistics
As of 11 August 2022.

Player and coach statistics
As of 11 August 2022.

Most European appearances (player)

Most goals scored in European competitions

Most European appearances (coach)

Coach in bold is currently active for Levski

Statistics by country
Including 2022–23 season.

Results by competition

UEFA Champions League / European Cup

UEFA Cup Winners' Cup / European Cup Winners' Cup

UEFA Europa League / UEFA Cup

UEFA Europa Conference League

Match details

1965–66 European Cup

1967–68 European Cup Winners' Cup

1969–70 European Cup Winners' Cup

1970–71 European Cup

1971–72 European Cup Winners' Cup

1972–73 UEFA Cup

1974–75 European Cup

1975–76 UEFA Cup

1976–77 European Cup Winners' Cup

1977–78 European Cup

1978–79 UEFA Cup

1979–80 European Cup

1980–81 UEFA Cup

1981–82 UEFA Cup

1982–83 UEFA Cup

1983–84 UEFA Cup

1984–85 European Cup

1986–87 European Cup Winners' Cup

1987–88 European Cup Winners' Cup

1988–89 European Cup

1989–90 UEFA Cup

1991–92 European Cup Winners' Cup

1992–93 European Cup Winners' Cup

1993–94 UEFA Champions League

1994–95 UEFA Cup

1995–96 UEFA Cup

1996–97 UEFA Cup Winners' Cup

1997–98 UEFA Cup Winners' Cup

1998–99 UEFA Cup Winners' Cup

1999–2000 UEFA Cup

2000–01 UEFA Champions League

2001–02 UEFA Champions League

2001–02 UEFA Cup

2002–03 UEFA Champions League

2002–03 UEFA Cup

2003–04 UEFA Cup

2004–05 UEFA Cup

2005–06 UEFA Cup

Group F

Knockout stage

2006–07 UEFA Champions League

Group A

2007–08 UEFA Champions League

2008–09 UEFA Champions League

2008–09 UEFA Cup

2009–10 UEFA Champions League

2009–10 UEFA Europa League
Group G

2010–11 UEFA Europa League

Group C

2011–12 UEFA Europa League

2012–13 UEFA Europa League

2013–14 UEFA Europa League

2016–17 UEFA Europa League

2017–18 UEFA Europa League

2018–19 UEFA Europa League

2019–20 UEFA Europa League

2022–23 UEFA Europa Conference League

References

Eur
Levski